O Jae-eun (born 15 May 1983) is a South Korean alpine skier. She competed in two events at the 2006 Winter Olympics.She won a bronze medal at the 2007 Asian Winter Games.

References

External links
 

1983 births
Living people
South Korean female alpine skiers
Olympic alpine skiers of South Korea
Alpine skiers at the 2006 Winter Olympics
Sportspeople from Seoul
Asian Games medalists in alpine skiing
Asian Games silver medalists for South Korea
Asian Games bronze medalists for South Korea
Alpine skiers at the 2003 Asian Winter Games
Alpine skiers at the 2007 Asian Winter Games
Medalists at the 2003 Asian Winter Games
Medalists at the 2007 Asian Winter Games
21st-century South Korean women